Marcus Kleveland (born 25 April 1999) is a Norwegian professional snowboarder who specializes in the slopestyle and big air events. He was the first ever to complete a quad cork 1800 in competition and won gold in Slopestyle and silver in Big Air at his Winter X Games debut in 2017. He also won the world cup of Milan in November 2016. In 2018, he won 2 medals at Winter X Games : Gold at Slopestyle and a 2nd place at Big Air. Following the X Games, Kleveland attended his first Olympics at only 18, placing 6th in the Men's Slopestyle and 18th in Big Air. After the Winter Olympics, he won 3rd place at the 2018 Burton U-S Open Slopestyle. In the Big Air event at X Games 2021 he took home gold. Marcus achieved his best feat in competition obtaining three medals at the Winter X Games 2022. He took home gold in the Men's Snowboard Big Air and Men's Snowboard Knuckle Huck, as well as a silver in Men's Snowboard Slopestyle. Kleveland placed 8th in Men's Slopestyle at the 2022 Winter Olympics.

References

External links
 
 
 
 
 

Norwegian male snowboarders
Living people
1999 births
X Games athletes
Sportspeople from Lillehammer
Olympic snowboarders of Norway
Snowboarders at the 2018 Winter Olympics
Snowboarders at the 2022 Winter Olympics
21st-century Norwegian people